The Inter-Provincial T20 Festival, known for sponsorship reasons as the Hanley Energy Inter-Provincial T20 Festival, is a Twenty20 cricket tournament in Ireland over three days between the four leading cricketing provinces of Ireland. The tournament was first held in July 2018 at Pembroke Cricket Club in Sandymount, Dublin. All four inter-provincial sides in the season long T20 competition, the Inter-Provincial Trophy, will take part.

Format
The tournament, inaugurated in 2018 is held as a single round-robin format with each team playing each other once, with six matches over three days between 6 and 8 July 2018.

Teams
Four teams will initially participate in the tournament, Leinster, Northern and North-West, and Munster . Pembroke Cricket Club will host the competition.

Competition placings

2018 to Present

See also

Cricket in Ireland
History of cricket
Inter-Provincial Championship
Inter-Provincial Cup
Inter-Provincial Trophy

References and notes

Irish domestic cricket competitions
Twenty20 cricket leagues